Joana Griniuvienė (1865–1918), was a Lithuanian politician (Social Democrat), publisher, book merchant and feminist. 

She was one of the pioneering women of Lithuanian politics, being a member of the Social Democratic Party in 1897 and elected to its central committee . 

She was in important figure within the political press of the time. 

She was active in the First Congress of Lithuanian Women and the Lithuanian Women's Union.

References

Joana Pavalkytė - Griniuvienė (G. Ilgunas) 

1865 births
1918 deaths
20th-century Lithuanian women politicians
20th-century Lithuanian politicians
19th-century Lithuanian women
19th-century women politicians